"The Other Woman" is a song written by Betty Sue Perry that was originally recorded by American country artist Loretta Lynn. It was released as a single in March 1963 via Decca Records.

Background and reception 
"The Other Woman" was recorded at the Columbia Recording Studio on January 9, 1963. Located in Nashville, Tennessee, the session was produced by renowned country music producer Owen Bradley. Also included on the session was background vocal group The Jordanaires. 

"The Other Woman" reached number thirteen on the Billboard Hot Country Singles survey in 1963. The song became her second hit single under the Decca recording label. "Success" was included on her debut studio album in 1963, Loretta Lynn Sings.

Track listings 
7" vinyl single
 "The Other Woman" – 2:26
 "Who'll Help Me Get Over You" – 2:45

Charts

Weekly charts

References 

1963 songs
1963 singles
Decca Records singles
Loretta Lynn songs
Song recordings produced by Owen Bradley
Songs written by Betty Sue Perry